Fiona Ferelith Hodgson, Baroness Hodgson of Abinger,  (née Allom) is a Conservative politician and life peer.

Biography
She was educated at senior level at Queen Anne's School, Caversham, Berkshire and Guildford High School, Surrey.  She was granted a life peerage to join the House of Lords in September 2013.

Appointed a Commander of the Order of the British Empire (CBE) in the 2012 New Year Honours having expertise in quality review and audit in the provision of private healthcare services. the peerage was created on 16 September 2013 taking the title Baroness Hodgson of Abinger, of Abinger in the County of Surrey. 

She is an Honorary Vice President of the Conservative Women's Organisation and Chair of the Governance Board of the Independent [Healthcare] Sector Complaints Adjudication Service, part of the Association of Independent Healthcare Organisations.

In 1982 Hodgson married Robin Granville Hodgson, who was created a life peer in 2000.

References

People educated at Queen Anne's School
People educated at Guildford High School
Conservative Party (UK) life peers
Life peeresses created by Elizabeth II
Spouses of life peers
Living people
1954 births